Vili (Ibhili) is a minor Bantu language of Gabon.

References

Nzebi languages
Languages of Gabon